Norman Edward Wells (born September 8, 1957) is a former American football guard in the National Football League (NFL) for the Dallas Cowboys. He was drafted by the Cowboys in the twelfth round of the 1980 NFL Draft. He played college football at Northwestern University.

Early years
Wells attended Warren Mott High School, where he played defensive tackle. He accepted a football scholarship from Northwestern University. In 1978, he suffered a season-ending knee injury in the first game and received an extra year of eligibility.

He returned to become a starter at right defensive tackle. In his only year as a starter he posted 65 tackles (fifth on the team), 4 tackles for loss and one interception.

Professional career
Wells was selected by the Dallas Cowboys in the twelfth round (330th overall) of the 1980 NFL Draft. He was converted into an offensive guard in training camp. He played in three games on special teams before spraining his knee against the Tampa Bay Buccaneers and being placed on the injured reserve list on October 3, 1980. Wells was activated for the playoffs on January 2.

In 1981, his knee injury kept him on the injured reserve list all season. In 1982, he was placed again on injured reserve on August 24, after failing his physical from complications from his previous knee injury, that eventually forced him to retire.

References

External links
Just Sports Stats

Living people
1957 births
Sportspeople from Warren, Michigan
Players of American football from Michigan
American football offensive linemen
American football defensive tackles
Northwestern Wildcats football players
Dallas Cowboys players